Alexander Yevgenyevich Lipatov (born 10 June 1981 in Leningrad, Soviet Union) is a Russian slalom canoeist who has competed at the international level since 1998.

At the 2008 Summer Olympics in Beijing, he was eliminated in the semifinals of the C1 event finishing 10th overall. Four years later at the 2012 Summer Olympics in London he finished 11th in the C1 event after being eliminated in the semifinals. He finished 13th in the C1 event at the 2016 Summer Olympics in Rio de Janeiro.

World Cup individual podiums

References

External links
 
 

1981 births
Canoeists at the 2008 Summer Olympics
Canoeists at the 2012 Summer Olympics
Canoeists at the 2016 Summer Olympics
Living people
Olympic canoeists of Russia
Sportspeople from Saint Petersburg
Russian male canoeists